Brash Books is an American crime fiction imprint founded in 2014 by authors Lee Goldberg and Joel Goldman. The main focus of Brash Books is to republish award-winning and critically acclaimed novels, primarily from the 1970s, 1980s and 1990s, which had fallen out of print. The imprint also publishes new crime fiction and suspense novels.

The imprint launched in September 2014 with 29 reprints, including the Nero Award-winning Sleeping Dog by Dick Lochte, Edgar Award finalist Lover Man by Dallas Murphy, and the new novel Treasure Coast by Tom Kakonis. The company has since published other books, such as Mark Smith's Death of the Detective, a National Book Award finalist, Barbara Neely's Blanche on the Lam, (recipient of the Agatha and Anthony Award), Max Allan Collins' novel Road to Perdition in a new, expanded edition (incorporating material from his original graphic novel, elements from his novelization of the feature screenplay, and new material), and Carolyn Weston's Poor, Poor Ophelia, which inspired the television series The Streets of San Francisco. Brash has published 100 novels as of mid-2019. Brash's titles are available as paperbacks through the Ingram Content Group and Baker & Taylor.

Goldberg and Goldman, longtime friends, hatched the idea for Brash Books after a discussion at the 2013 Bouchercon convention in Albany, New York. When Goldberg mentioned to Goldman that he wanted to find a way to republish some of his favorite out-of-print titles, Goldman, a former lawyer, offered to help him create the business. The company's name was inspired by their slogan, "We publish the best crime novels in existence", which Goldberg describes as "a brash claim, but we believe our novels back it up." Goldberg serves as the publisher's book scout and handles most of its social media, while Goldman deals with financial and legal matters.

Other authors published by Brash include top ten New York Times bestselling authors Robin Burcell, Max Allan Collins and Phoef Sutton, and  Edgar Award nominees Noreen Ayers, Bill Crider, and Jack Lynch.

In 2017, they launched the subsidiary Brash Audio and produced a dozen audiobooks in their first year. They also published Leo W. Banks' original novel Double Wide, which won two 2018 Spur Awards, for Best First Novel and Best Contemporary Western, from the Western Writers of America.  Double Wide was also named True West's Magazine's Best Contemporary Western of the Year.

In 2019, they republished the twelve Hardman crime novels by Ralph Dennis, as well as four of his long-lost, unpublished works. The Hardman books included introductions by author Joe R. Lansdale, among others.

A newly discovered thirteenth Hardman novel, All Kinds of Ugly, was released in February 2020  with revisions by Goldberg. That same month, they also released a lost, previously unpublished book by Hammer Horror writer/director/producer Jimmy Sangster. The book is titled Fireball and is the fourth book in his James Reed series (Snowball, Blackball and Hardball), that was published in the late 1980s.

Authors

 Tom Ardies
 Noreen Ayres
 Leo Banks
 Keith Bruton
 Craig Faustus Buck
 Jack Bunker
 Robin Burcell
 Max Allan Collins
 Michael Craft
 Bill Crider
 Ralph Dennis
 Gerald Duff
 Robert Dunn
 Dawn Farnham
 Bob Forward
 Michael Genelin
 Parnell Hall
 Gar Anthony Haywood
 Harry Hunsicker
 Tom Kakonis
 Tony Knighton
 Stan Lee
 Dick Lochte
 Jack Lynch
 Geoffrey Miller
 Margaret Moseley
 Dallas Murphy
 A.W. Mykel
 Barbara Neely
 Maxine O'Callaghan
 Stephen O'Shea
 William Reynolds
 W.L. Ripley
 Jim Sanderson
 John Sanford
 Jimmy Sangster
 Mark Smith
 Craig Smith
 Michael Stone
 Andy Straka
 Phoef Sutton
 Doug J. Swanson
 Ted Thackrey Jr.
 Phillip Thompson
 Jack Trolley
 Jane Waterhouse
 Carolyn Weston

References

External links
 
 Lee Goldberg: A Brash Idea Becomes a Publishing Company

Book publishing companies of the United States
Publishing companies established in 2014
2014 establishments in the United States